The Toirano Caves (Italian: Grotte di Toirano) are a karst cave system in the municipality of Toirano, in the province of Savona, Liguria, Italy.

Overview
The area is situated close to the town of Toirano and few kilometers to the Ligurian Ponente Riviera. The exit "Borghetto Santo Spirito" of A10 motorway is 5 km far from the caves. One of the most important caves is "Basura", discovered in 1950, and shelter of the Cave bear (Ursus spelaeus).

Gallery

See also
Borgio Verezzi Caves
List of caves
List of caves in Italy

References

External links

 Grotte di Toirano official site
Toirano Caves on showcaves.com

Toirano
Landforms of Liguria
Toirano
Toirano
Province of Savona
Tourist attractions in Liguria